Agoseris retrorsa is a North American species of flowering plant in the family Asteraceae known by the common name spearleaf agoseris or spearleaf mountain dandelion.

It is native to western North America from Washington to Utah to Baja California, where it grows in many types of habitat, including chaparral, scrub, and coniferous forest.

Description
Agoseris retrorsa is a perennial herb forming a base of leaves about a number of erect, thick, wool-coated inflorescences up to half a meter in height. The narrow leaves are linear to lance-shaped, and spearlike with curving toothlike lobes along the edges.

The inflorescence bears a single flower head which is several centimeters wide when fully open. It is lined with woolly, pointed phyllaries which are green, often with reddish purple longitudinal streaks or stripes. The flower head contains many golden yellow ray florets, the outer ones usually darker in color.

The fruit is an achene with a plumelike pappus of white bristles.

References

External links
Jepson Manual Treatment: Agoseris retrorsa
United States Department of Agriculture Plants Profile: Agoseris retrorsa
Agoseris retrorsa — Calphotos Photo gallery, University of California

retrorsa
Flora of Baja California
Flora of California
Flora of Idaho
Flora of Nevada
Flora of Oregon
Flora of Utah
Flora of the Great Basin
Flora of the Sierra Nevada (United States)
Natural history of the California chaparral and woodlands
Natural history of the California Coast Ranges
Natural history of the Peninsular Ranges
Natural history of the Transverse Ranges
Plants described in 1849
Taxa named by George Bentham
Taxa named by Edward Lee Greene
Flora without expected TNC conservation status